The Rooftop is a collaborative studio album by American hip hop recording artists Webstar and Jim Jones. It was released on October 6, 2009, by E1 Music, as well as Webstar's label imprint Scilla Hill, and Jones' label imprint Splash Records. The album was supported by two singles: "Dancin on Me" and "She Can Get It".

Critical reception

Reviews were mixed. Amanda Bassa of HipHopDX said the album is best for "an alcohol-fueled night on the town, the Webstar and Jim Jones collaboration serves as the perfect chaser to an overpriced shot at the club, possessing the energy that will keep people dancing until last call."

Commercial performance
The album sold 2,400 copies its first week, failing to crack the US Billboard 200 or any other major music charts.

Track listing

References

2009 albums
DJ Webstar albums
Jim Jones (rapper) albums
E1 Music albums
Collaborative albums